Ryazhsky District is an administrative and municipal district (raion), one of the twenty-five in Ryazan Oblast, Russia. It is located in the south of the oblast. Its administrative center is the town of Ryazhsk. Population: 29,026 (2010 Census);  The population of Ryazhsk accounts for 74.7% of the district's total population.

Notable residents 

Boris Novikov (1925–1997), Soviet stage and film actor, People's Artist of Russia, born in Ryazhsk

References

Notes

Sources

Districts of Ryazan Oblast